Osinovo is a rural locality (a village) and the administrative center of Osinovskoye Rural Settlement of Vinogradovsky District, Arkhangelsk Oblast, Russia. The population was 359 as of 2010. There is 1 street.

Geography 
Osinovo is located on the Severnaya Dvina River, 4 km northeast of Bereznik (the district's administrative centre) by road. Bereznik is the nearest rural locality.

References 

Rural localities in Vinogradovsky District